Thomas Rogers or Tom Rogers may refer to:

Arts and entertainment
 Thomas Rogers (writer) (1927–2007), American novelist
 Thomas D. Rogers (born 1945), American sculptor/engraver, designed Sacagawea dollar coin
 Thomas Rogers, character in And Then There Were None, 1945 American film

Sports
 Tom Rogers (footballer) (1885–?), English footballer 
 Tom Rogers (baseball) (1892–1936), American baseball player
 Tom Rogers (American football, born 1902) (1902–1976), American college football player and coach at Denison University
 Tom Rogers (American football, born 1910) (1910–?), American college football player and coach at Wake Forest University
 Tom Rogers (cricketer, born 1994), Australian cricketer
 Tom Rogers (cricketer, born 1999), Australian cricketer
 Tom Rogers (rugby union) (born 1998), Welsh rugby player

Others
 Thomas Rogers (priest) (died 1616), English Anglican clergyman, controversialist, and translator
 Thomas Rogers (Mayflower passenger) (died 1621), English passenger on the Mayflower
 Thomas Rogers (Old Orchard Beach) (fl. 1600s), American settler and founder of Old Orchard Beach, Maine
 Thomas Rogers (MP) (1735–1793), English banker
 Thomas Jones Rogers (1781–1832), United States congressman from Pennsylvania
 Thomas Rogers (locomotive builder) (1792–1856), American mechanical engineer
 Thomas Rogers (deacon) (1806–1903), Anglican clergyman and campaigner for convict rights in Australia
 Thomas Edward Rogers (1912–1999), British diplomat
 Tom Rogers (executive), American television executive, president and CEO of TiVo

See also
 Tommy Rogers (disambiguation)
 Thomas Rodgers (disambiguation)